Interleukin-23 subunit alpha is a protein that in humans is encoded by the IL23A gene.  IL-23 is produced by dendritic cells and macrophages.

Interleukin-23 is a heterodimeric cytokine composed of an IL-12p40 subunit that is shared with IL-12 and the IL-23p19 subunit. A functional receptor for IL-23 (the IL-23 receptor) has been identified and is composed of IL-12R β1 and IL-23R.

Function 

IL-23 is an important part of the inflammatory response against infection. It promotes upregulation of the matrix metalloprotease MMP9, increases angiogenesis and reduces CD8+ T-cell infiltration into tumours. IL-23 mediates its effects on both innate and adaptive arms of the immune system that express the IL-23 receptor. Th17 cells represent the most prominent T cell subset that responds to IL-23, although IL-23 has been implicated in inhibiting the development of regulatory T cell development in the intestine. Th17 cells produce IL-17, a proinflammatory cytokine that enhances T cell priming and stimulates the production of other proinflammatory molecules such as IL-1, IL-6, TNF-alpha, NOS-2, and chemokines resulting in inflammation. 

The expression of IL23A is decreased after AHR knockdown in THP-1 cells and primary mouse macrophages.

Clinical significance 

Knockout mice deficient in either p40 or p19, or in either subunit of the IL-23 receptor (IL-23R and IL12R-β1) develop less severe symptoms of experimental autoimmune encephalomyelitis (EAE) and inflammatory bowel disease highlighting the importance of IL-23 in the inflammatory pathway.

Discovery 

A computational search for IL-12 homologue genes found p19, a gene that encodes a cytokine chain. Experimental work revealed that p19 formed a heterodimer by binding to p40, a subunit of IL-12. This new heterodimer was named IL-23.

Knockdown of AHR decreases the expression of IL23A in THP-1 cells and primary macrophage.

See also 

 Ustekinumab, a monoclonal antibody targeting both IL-12 and IL-23 and used to treat plaque psoriasis, launched in the United States under the brand name Stelara

References

Further reading 

 
 
 
 
 
 
 
 
 
 
 
 
 

Interleukins